The 2013 Philippine Basketball Association (PBA) Governors' Cup was the third and last conference of the 2012–13 PBA season. Due to the preparations for the 2013 FIBA Asia Championship, the conference started on August 14, 2013, and finished on October 25, 2013.

The tournament is an import-laden format, which allows an import or a pure-foreign player for each team and with a height limit of 6-foot-5.

The finals is sponsored by PLDT Telpad.

Format
The tournament format for this conference is as follows:
 Single-round robin eliminations; 9 games per team; Teams are then seeded by basis on win–loss records. 
Top eight teams will advance to the quarterfinals. In case of tie, playoffs will be held only for the #4 and #8 seeds.
Quarterfinals:
QF1: #1 seed vs #8 seed (#1 seed twice-to-beat)
QF2: #2 seed vs #7 seed (#2 seed twice-to-beat)
QF3: #3 seed vs #6 seed (#3 seed twice-to-beat)
QF4: #4 seed vs #5 seed (#4 seed twice-to-beat)
Semifinals (best-of-5 series):
SF1: QF1 vs. QF4 winners
SF2: QF2 vs. QF3 winners
Finals (best-of-7 series)
Winners of the semifinals

Elimination round

Team standings

Schedule

Results

Eighth seed playoff

Bracket

Quarterfinals

(1) Petron Blaze vs. (8) Barangay Ginebra

(2) San Mig Coffee vs. (7) Alaska

(3) Meralco vs. (6) Barako Bull

(4) Rain or Shine vs. (5) GlobalPort

Semifinals

(1) Petron Blaze vs. (4) Rain or Shine

(2) San Mig Coffee vs. (3) Meralco

Finals

Imports 
The following is the list of imports, which had played for their respective teams at least once, with the returning imports in italics. Highlighted are the imports who stayed with their respective teams for the whole conference.

Awards

Conference
Best Player of the Conference:	Arwind Santos (Petron Blaze Boosters)
Bobby Parks Best Import of the Conference:	Marqus Blakely (San Mig Coffee Mixers)
Finals MVP: Marc Pingris (San Mig Coffee Mixers)

Players of the Week

References

External links
 PBA.ph

PBA Governors' Cup
Governors' Cup